This is a list of museums in the Cayman Islands.

Museums in the Cayman Islands 

Bodden Town Mission House, Grand Cayman
Cayman Islands National Museum
Old Savannah School House

See also 
 List of museums

External links 	

 
Cayman Islands
Cayman Islands
Museums